The Change was a  British radio Sitcom that originally aired from November 2001 - November 2004, running for 3 series on  BBC Radio 4.

Written by Jan Etherington and Gavin Petrie it was a "Sitcom about a troubled hormonal wife and a transvestite husband".

The story follows motor mechanic, George (Christopher Ellison), who announces he is a transvestite to his wife Carol (Lynda Bellingham), who is undergoing "the change". George's mother Violet (Sylvia Syms) has known about his "dressing-up" since his childhood and sees nothing wrong in it.

Other parts were played by Maureen Beattie, Mark Powley,  Kevin Bishop, Richard Standing, Emma Kennedy and James Vaughan.

References

External links
Lavalie, John. The Change. EpGuides. 21 Jul 2005. 29 Jul 2005

2000 radio programme debuts
BBC Radio 4 programmes